Ugam Range (Ógem jotasy) is a mountain range in South Kazakhstan Region of Kazakhstan and Tashkent Region in Uzbekistan. It is part of Western Tian Shan. The range runs from northeast to southwest; in the northeast, it joins the Talas Alatau; in the southwest, it gradually flattens towards the valley of the Syr Darya. It marks the border between Kazakhstan and Uzbekistan.

Pskem Range runs parallel to Ugam Range to the south, and the Pskem River valley separates the ranges. The Pskem enters the Charvak Reservoir, which has the only outflow, the Chirchiq River, a major right tributary of the Syr Darya. The upper Chirchiq valley and the reservoir are bounded by Ugam Range from the north. The rivers on the northern slopes of the range flow to the Ugam River, a right tributary of the Chirchiq.

In Uzbekistan, Ugam Range is located within Bostanliq District of Tashkent Region. In Kazakhstan, it is shared between Tole Bi and Kazygurt Districts of South Kazakhstan Region.

Ugam-Chatkal National Park is partially located on the southern slopes of Ugam Range, in Uzbekistan.

References

Mountain ranges of Kazakhstan
Mountain ranges of Uzbekistan
Mountain ranges of the Tian Shan